Rear Admiral Bertram Wilfrid Taylor CB, DSC (23 March 1906 – 1970) was a Royal Navy officer who became Flag Officer Submarines.

Naval career
Taylor served in the Second World War becoming commanding officer of the submarine HMS Severn in May 1939, of the frigate HMS Bligh in January 1945 and of the destroyer HMS Exmoor in July 1945. He went on to be Chief of Staff to the Flag Officer Submarines in November 1950, Captain of the Fleet, Home Fleet in March 1954 and Flag Officer Submarines in November 1957. He was appointed a Companion of the Order of the Bath on 1 January 1959 before retiring in November 1959.

References

1906 births
1970 deaths
Royal Navy admirals
Companions of the Order of the Bath
Recipients of the Distinguished Service Cross (United Kingdom)